Plakortis is a genus of marine sponges in the order Homosclerophorida, first described by Franz Eilhard Schulze in 1880.

Description
Plakortis sponges are characterised by  having:
inorganic (spicular) skeletal complement
Skeleton composed mainly of diods, triods, and/or calthrops in one size class
 Lophose diods, triods, or calthrops complement the main skeleton of non-lophose spicules
 no lophose spicules
 diactinal "microscleres" (microrhabs) in some species

Species
List of accepted species:
Plakortis albicans 
Plakortis angulospiculatus 
Plakortis badabaluensis 
Plakortis bergquistae 
Plakortis clarionensis 
Plakortis communis 
Plakortis copiosa 
Plakortis dariae 
Plakortis deweerdtaephila 
Plakortis edwardsi 
Plakortis erythraena 
Plakortis fromontae 
Plakortis galapagensis 
Plakortis halichondrioides 
Plakortis hooperi 
Plakortis insularis 
Plakortis japonica 
Plakortis kenyensis 
Plakortis lita 
Plakortis mesophotica 
Plakortis microrhabdifera 
Plakortis myrae 
Plakortis nigra 
Plakortis petrupaulensis 
Plakortis potiguarensis 
Plakortis pulvillus 
Plakortis quasiamphiaster 
Plakortis ruetzleri 
Plakortis simplex 
Plakortis spinalis 
Plakortis symbiotica 
Plakortis zyggompha

Literature

Chemical and medecinal properties

References

Homoscleromorpha
Animals described in 1880
Taxa named by Franz Eilhard Schulze